Hope Meets Foster is an album by  jazz pianist Elmo Hope and saxophonist Frank Foster recorded in 1955 for the Prestige label.

Reception

The Allmusic review by Scott Yanow stated "nothing that innovative occurs but the music should please bop fans".

Track listing
All compositions by Elmo Hope except where noted
 "Wail, Frank, Wail" - 6:28  
 "Zarou" (Frank Foster, Hope) - 5:16  
 "Fosterity" (Foster) - 6:17  
 "Georgia on My Mind" (Hoagy Carmichael, Stuart Gorrell) - 6:41  
 "Shutout" (Foster) - 5:51  
 "Yaho" - 7:38

Personnel 
Frank Foster - tenor saxophone
Elmo Hope - piano
John Ore - bass
Art Taylor - drums
Charles Freeman Lee - trumpet (tracks 2, 3 & 5)

References 

1955 albums
Albums produced by Bob Weinstock
Albums recorded at Van Gelder Studio
Prestige Records albums
Elmo Hope albums
Frank Foster (musician) albums